Nausinoe argyrosticta is a moth in the family Crambidae. It was described by George Hampson in 1910. It is found in Burundi, the Democratic Republic of the Congo (Katanga), Tanzania and Zambia.

References

Moths described in 1910
Spilomelinae